Jabez Fitch may refer to:
 Jabez G. Fitch (1764–1824), businessman and political figure from Vermont
 Jabez W. Fitch (1823–1884), American politician, Lieutenant Governor of Ohio